Winkworth Arboretum is a National Trust-owned arboretum in the spread-out civil parish of Busbridge between Godalming and Hascombe, south-west Surrey, England.

The  arboretum was founded by Dr Wilfrid Fox, starting in 1938 and continuing through World War II. He cleared the land and planted it with carefully chosen trees and shrubs to maximise its autumnal appearance. Once it was established, he presented it to the National Trust in 1952.

Winkworth Arboretum exhibits over 1000 species of trees as well as large collections of azalea, rhododendron, and holly on slopes leading down to landscaped garden lakes. Gertrude Jekyll explored the woods in the early 20th century.

References

External links
Winkworth Arboretum - Official site at the National Trust

Arboreta in England
Botanical gardens in England
Gardens in Surrey
National Trust properties in Surrey
Parks and open spaces in Surrey
Busbridge, Surrey
Lakes of Surrey